Pricetown is an unincorporated community in Mahoning and Trumbull counties, in the U.S. state of Ohio.

The community was named for Robert Price, the proprietor of a local mill.

References

Unincorporated communities in Mahoning County, Ohio
Unincorporated communities in Trumbull County, Ohio
Unincorporated communities in Ohio